At the 1956 Summer Olympics in Melbourne, nine events in sprint canoe racing were contested.  The program was unchanged from the previous two Games in 1948 and 1952.  The competition was held on Lake Wendouree in Ballarat.

Medal table

Medal summary

Men's events

Women's event

References
1956 Summer Olympics official report. pp. 396–410.
 

 
1956 Summer Olympics events
1956
Canoeing and kayaking competitions in Australia
1956 in canoeing